National Democratic Rally may refer to:

 National Democratic Rally (Senegal)
 National Democratic Rally (Syria)
 National Rally for Democracy (Algeria)

See also 
 Democratic Rally (disambiguation)